Gibberula louisae is a species of sea snail, a marine gastropod mollusk, in the family Cystiscidae.

Distribution
This marine species occurs off the following locations:
Mauritius
Réunion

References

 Roth, B. & Clover, P. W., 1973. A review of the Marginellidae described by Bavay, 1903-1922. The Veliger 16(2): 207-215
 Boyer F. (2014). Révision des Gibberula (Gastropoda : Cystiscidae) du niveau récifal de l'archipel des Mascareignes. Xenophora Taxonomy. 5: 7-16

External links
 Dekker, H.; Orlin, Z. (2000). Check-list of Red Sea Mollusca. Spirula. 47 (supplement): 1-46

louisae
Gastropods described in 1913